George Frank Salter (18 April 1834 – 15 August 1911) was an English cricketer.  Salter's batting and bowling styles are unknown.  He was born at Brighton, Sussex.

Salter made a single first-class appearance for Sussex against Kent at Clifton Villa Estate, Margate in 1864.  In this match, he opened the batting in Sussex's first-innings and scored 15 runs before he was run out.  He ended Sussex's second-innings unbeaten on 4, with Sussex winning by 9 wickets.  This was his only major appearance for Sussex.

He later stood as an umpire in a first-class match between Sussex and Cambridge University at the County Ground, Hove in 1889.  He died at Chichester, Sussex on 15 August 1911.

References

External links
George Salter at ESPNcricinfo
George Salter at CricketArchive

1834 births
1911 deaths
Sportspeople from Brighton
English cricketers
Sussex cricketers
English cricket umpires